Largo may refer to:

Music
 Largo (Italian for 'wide', 'broad'), a very slow tempo, or a musical piece or movement in such a tempo
 "Largo" from Xerxes arranged from "Ombra mai fu", the opening aria from Handel's opera Serse
 Hugo Largo, an American band from the 1980s
 Largo (Brad Mehldau album), 2002
 Largo (Americana album), a 1998 Americana music project produced by Rick Chertoff and Rob Hyman
 Zeit (Tangerine Dream album), subtitled Largo in Four Movements, a 1972 album by Tangerine Dream
 "Largo", a song from Fiona Apple's album The Idler Wheel...

Places

Bulgaria
 Largo, Sofia, an architectural ensemble of three Socialist Classicism edifices

Italy
 Largo di Torre Argentina, a square in Rome

Scotland
 Largo, Fife, an ecclesiastical and civil parish of Fife, Scotland
 Adjacent villages in the parish of Largo, Scotland
 Lower Largo
 Upper Largo

United States
 Key Largo, an island in the Florida Keys, USA
 Largo, California, a community in Mendocino County, California, USA
 Largo, Florida
 Largo, Maryland, a  suburb of Washington, D.C.

Characters
 Largo (Megatokyo), the lead character in the webcomic Megatokyo
 Largo Winch, a comic book series and its eponymous character 
 Largo Winch (TV series), adaptation of the comic book series
 Largo Winch (film), a 2008 adaptation of the comic book series
 Emilio Largo and Maximillian Largo, characters from the James Bond series of novels and films
 Largo LaGrande, a minor character in the Monkey Island series of adventure games
 Mr. Largo, a character from The Simpsons
 Largo the Black Lion, the main villain in Tales of the Abyss.                                                                       Largo Silmes a mixed silme from game Silme Rancher

Other uses
 9×23mm Largo, a centerfire pistol cartridge
 HMS Largo Bay (K423), Bay-class anti-aircraft frigate of the British navy
 Largo (nightclub) in Los Angeles, California
 Largo High School (disambiguation)
 Nissan Largo, people-mover automobile made by Nissan

See also

 Live at Largo (disambiguation)